"Day by Day (and with Each Passing Moment)" is a Christian hymn written in 1865 by Lina Sandell several years after she had witnessed the tragic drowning death of her father. It is a hymn of assurance used in American congregational singing.

Sandell-Berg was a prolific Swedish hymn writer. Two of her hymns, "Day By Day" and "Children of the Heavenly Father" are widely known in the United States. The original and most popular English translation of the hymn is by Andrew L. Skoog, a Swedish immigrant to the United States. "Day by Day" started appearing in American hymnals in the latter half of the 1920s, and its popularity has increased since then. The hymn's tune was composed in 1872 by Oscar Ahnfelt.

The hymn's Swedish name is "Blott en dag," its first three words in Swedish. The words mean "just one day" or "just another day." In Sweden and Finland, it is popular at funerals. It was recorded by Carola Häggkvist in 1998 on the album Blott en dag. Other Swedish recordings include one in 1965 by Curt & Roland and on Anna-Lena Löfgren's 1972 Christmas album, Nu tändas tusen juleljus.

Lyrics

Robert Leaf's translation from the Swedish Lutheran Book of Worship hymnal is:
Day by day, your mercies attend me,
Bringing comfort to my anxious soul.
Day by day the blessings Lord, you send me
Draw me nearer to my heavenly goal.
Love divine, beyond all mortal measure,
Brings to naught the burdens of my quest;
Savior lead me to the home I treasure,
Where at last I find eternal rest.

References

1865 songs
1998 singles
American Christian hymns
Swedish-language songs
Carola Häggkvist songs
Lutheran hymns
19th-century hymns